Bleeding Heart (originally titled Shiva & May) is a 2015 American drama film written and directed by Diane Bell and starring Jessica Biel, Zosia Mamet, Joe Anderson and Edi Gathegi. The film was produced by Jonathan Schwartz, Andrea Sperling, and Greg Ammon.

Plot
May, a yoga instructor (Biel) makes contact with her younger half-sister Shiva (Mamet); the two share a mother, Susan, but were born ten years apart, with their mother giving May up for adoption to a rich family while Shiva bounced around foster homes. Despite their glaringly different backgrounds, the two bond quickly, although May is soon uncomfortable about Shiva's boyfriend Cody (Anderson). Dex, May's boyfriend and partner in their yoga school, is uncomfortable around Shiva when he learns about her true history, but May refuses to leave her sister, particularly when she finds that Shiva returned a thousand dollars that May had given her to pay for rent.

Cast
Zosia Mamet as  Shiva
Jessica Biel as  May 
Joe Anderson as Cody
Edi Gathegi as Dex
Kate Burton as Martha
Harry Hamlin as Ed (cameo)

Production
On October 1, 2013, Diane Bell started casting for her new film. On October 7, Jessica Biel and Zosia Mamet were officially cast as long-lost sisters along with Kate Burton and Joe Anderson and it began shooting the same day. Edi Gathegi was cast a week later.

Filming
Filming started in Los Angeles in October 2013.

Release
The film premiered at the Tribeca Film Festival on April 16, 2015.

References

External links

2015 films
Films shot in Los Angeles
2015 drama films
American drama films
Films produced by Andrea Sperling
Films produced by Jonathan Schwartz
2010s English-language films
2010s American films